Un Segundo Sentimiento (A Second Feeling) is the title of a studio album recorded by Colombian performer Charlie Zaa. This album became his second number-one set on the Billboard Tropical Albums chart.

Track listing
This information adapted from Allmusic.

Chart performance

Sales and certifications

See also
List of number-one Billboard Tropical Albums from the 1990s

References

1998 albums
Charlie Zaa albums
Covers albums